Tit is a town and commune in Aoulef District, Adrar Province, south-central Algeria. According to the 2008 census it has a population of 4,417, up from 3,160 in 1998, with an annual growth rate of 3.5%.

Geography 

The oasis is a part of the Tidikelt region of the central Sahara that extends from central eastern Adrar Province (where Tit is located) to northeast Tamanrasset Province around In Salah. The oases in this region are sparser than in the Tuat and Gourara regions in which most of the population of Adrar Province live, but there are still a number of towns such as Aoulef, Timokten, Akabli, and In Ghar. The nearby land is mostly flat aside from some small hills to the east; however further north the land rises to the Tademaït plateau.

Climate 

Tit has a hot desert climate (Köppen climate classification BWh), with extremely hot summers and mild winters, and very little precipitation throughout the year.

Transportation 

Education

7.0% of the population has a tertiary education, and another 22.9% has completed secondary education. The overall literacy rate is 92.8%, and is 96.7% among males and 89.3% among females; all three rates are the highest in the province for any commune.

Localities
As of 1984, the commune was composed of one locality, Tit.

References 

Neighbouring towns and cities

Communes of Adrar Province